Treforest railway station is a railway station serving the village of Treforest, Rhondda Cynon Taf, Wales. Passenger services are provided by Transport for Wales.

The station is a short walk from the Treforest campus of the University of South Wales, and many of the passengers using the station are staff or students of the university.

A station at this location was first opened by the Taff Vale Railway in 1845.

History

The station at Treforest was not opened until 1847. As well as being served by trains between Merthyr & Cardiff on the main TVR route, it also acted as the junction station for the Llantrisant and Taff Vale Junction Railway branch line from its opening to passenger traffic in 1875.

The TVR was amalgamated with the Great Western Railway on 1 January 1922, along with the Barry Railway and several others. Both the Barry Railway and the TVR had stations named Treforest, so to avoid confusion, the ex-TVR station was renamed Treforest Low Level on 1 July 1924.

Services to both Cardiff and Barry on this route ended on 10 September 1962, whilst that to  had been withdrawn a decade earlier (on 31 March 1952). Both lines had closed completely by 1964.

The Welsh spelling of Trefforest was adopted on 12 May 1980.

Services 

A reduced service operates on Sundays (2-hourly to all three northbound destinations, 3 trains every two hours to Cardiff and beyond).

References

External links 

Railway stations in Rhondda Cynon Taf
DfT Category E stations
Former Taff Vale Railway stations
Railway stations in Great Britain opened in 1847
Railway stations served by Transport for Wales Rail
1847 establishments in Wales